Boyle Lake is a lake in Berrien County, in the U.S. state of Michigan.

Boyle Lake has the name of George Boyle, an early settler.

References

Lakes of Berrien County, Michigan